"Me, Myself & I" is a song by American rapper G-Eazy and American singer-songwriter Bebe Rexha, billed together as G-Eazy x Bebe Rexha. It was released on October 14, 2015, as the first single for his second studio album When It's Dark Out. "Me, Myself & I" was written by the two artists and Lauren Christy. The song was originally produced by Rexha and TMS and re-produced by Michael Keenan, with additional production by Christoph Andersson and G-Eazy. It was formerly both artists' highest-peaking single, until Rexha's song "Meant to Be" peaked at number two on the US Billboard Hot 100, and G-Eazy's song "No Limit" peaked at number four. It is also featured in the NBA 2K17 soundtrack.

Recording and production 
The original version of "Me, Myself and I" was written by Bebe Rexha, Lauren Christy, and TMS in early 2015 with the title "I Don't Need Anything". The song was intended to be part of Rexha's debut album, but her label wasn't convinced it fit the style of her upcoming record. She asked a friend to put her in contact with rapper G-Eazy, because she wanted to do the song with him. Rexha and G-Eazy met three days later and she played the track on piano for him. He loved the track and asked for the song to be on his album. Rexha accepted and began immediately working on the track with Michael Keenan, G-Eazy's producer. Rexha and Keenan re-produced the beat and decided to keep the chorus, post-chorus, and bridge of the original song and put G-Eazy's rap on the verses, while changing the title to "Me, Myself & I". She performed the acoustic of the original version of the song on Elvis Duran and the Morning Show on March 16, 2016.

Composition
According to musicnotes.com, the song is written in the key of C minor, with a tempo of 112 beats per minute.

Chart performance
The song debuted at number 89 on the US Billboard Hot 100 and peaked at number seven, becoming G-Eazy's first top 10 single and Rexha's second after David Guetta's "Hey Mama". It was also G-Eazy and Rexha's highest-charting single, until "Meant To Be" peaked at number two and "No Limit" peaked at number four, as well as the first number one song for both artists on the US Hot Rap Songs chart. As of December 2021, it has sold 7,000,000 copies in the United States.

Music video
The song's music video premiered on October 29, 2015, on G-Eazy's Vevo account on YouTube. Since its release, the video has received over 565 million views. Directed by Taj Stan's Berry, the video surrounds the scene of G-Eazy's birthday, where he is forced to reconcile with his anxieties and the man in the mirror. Bebe Rexha is shown singing throughout the music video.

Live performances
G-Eazy and Bebe Rexha have performed the song at Jimmy Kimmel Live on December 3, 2015, at Tonight Show with Jimmy Fallon on January 25, 2016 and at the 2016 iHeartRadio Music Awards on April 3, 2016.

On August 28, 2016, singer Britney Spears performed the song with G-Eazy at the 2016 MTV Video Music Awards, along with their song "Make Me". The mashup with Spears was also performed at the iHeartRadio Music Festival 2016 in Las Vegas on September 25, 2016, and live at her Las Vegas residency concert, Britney: Piece of Me, on October 21, 2016.

The song is also featured on the soundtrack to the basketball video game, NBA 2K17.

Track listing
Digital download
"Me, Myself & I" – 4:11

Digital download
"My, Myself & I" (Marc Stout & Scott Svejda Remix) – 4:35

Digital download
"Me, Myself & I" (Viceroy Remix) – 4:23

Cover versions
The song has been covered by American singer Britney Spears and remixed with her 2016 single "Make Me..." in a series of live performances with G-Eazy.

Personnel
Written by Bebe Rexha, G-Eazy, Lauren Christy, Ben Kohn, Tom Barnes, Peter Kelleher, Michael Keenan and Christoph Andersson
Originally produced by Bebe Rexha and TMS
Re-produced by Michael Keenan
Vocal production by TMS
Additional production by Christoph Andersson and G-Eazy
Mixing engineering by Dakarai Gwitira

Charts

Weekly charts

Year-end charts

Certifications

References

External links

2015 singles
2015 songs
Bebe Rexha songs
G-Eazy songs
Songs written by Bebe Rexha
RCA Records singles
Songs with feminist themes
Songs written by Lauren Christy
Songs written by Ben Kohn
Songs written by Tom Barnes (songwriter)
Songs written by Peter Kelleher (songwriter)
Songs written by G-Eazy